Diego Benítez may refer to:

 Diego Benítez (footballer, born 1988), Uruguayan football forward
 Diego Benítez (footballer, born 1991), Paraguayan football midfielder